Namibia competed at the 1996 Summer Olympics in Atlanta, United States.

Medalists

Silver
 Frankie Fredericks — Athletics, Men's 100 metres
 Frankie Fredericks — Athletics, Men's 200 metres

Athletics

Men
Track and road events

Women
Track and road events

Boxing

Men

Shooting

Men

Swimming

Men

Women

References
Official Olympic Reports
International Olympic Committee results database

Nations at the 1996 Summer Olympics
1996
Oly